Aadmi Aur Aurat is 1984 Hindi language telefilm directed by Tapan Sinha and starring Amol Palekar, Mahua Roychoudhury, Kalyan Chatterjee, Nirmal Ghosh, Parimal Sengupta, K. Singh, Dipak Sanyal, Sameer Mukharjee. The movie was telecast on Doordarshan, Government owned TV Channel of India. This film was screened in International Film Festival of India-2007.

Awards

References

External links
 

1984 films
1980s Hindi-language films
Best Film on National Integration National Film Award winners
Doordarshan television films